Joan Elisabeth Lowther Murray, MBE (née Clarke; 24 June 1917 – 4 September 1996) was an English cryptanalyst and numismatist best known for her work as a code-breaker at Bletchley Park during the Second World War. Although she did not personally seek the spotlight, her role in the Enigma project that decrypted the German's secret communications earned her awards and citations, such as appointment as a Member of the Order of the British Empire (MBE), in 1946.

Early life
Joan Elisabeth Lowther Clarke was born on 24 June 1917 in West Norwood, London, England. She was the youngest child of Dorothy (née Fulford) and the Revd William Kemp Lowther Clarke. She had three brothers and one sister.

Clarke attended Dulwich High School for Girls in south London and won a scholarship in 1936, to attend Newnham College, Cambridge, where she gained a double first degree in mathematics and was a Wrangler. She was denied a full degree, as until 1948 Cambridge awarded these only to males.

Clarke's mathematical abilities were first discovered by Gordon Welchman, in an undergraduate Geometry class at Cambridge. Welchman was one of the top four mathematicians to be recruited in 1939 to supervise decoding operations at Bletchley Park. After noticing Clarke's mathematical abilities he recruited her to join him at Bletchley Park and be a part of the 'Government Code and Cypher School' (GCCS).

The GCCS started up in 1939 with a single purpose: that of breaking the German Enigma Code. The Enigma machine was used by the Germans to encrypt their messages; they strongly believed their code was unbreakable. Clarke first arrived at Bletchley Park on 17 June 1940. She was initially placed in an all-women group, referred to as "The Girls", who mainly did routine clerical work. At this time, cryptology was not considered a job for a woman in England. According to Clarke, she knew of only one other female cryptologist working at Bletchley Park.

Career

Codebreaking at Bletchley Park
In June 1940, Clarke was recruited by her former academic supervisor, Gordon Welchman, to the Government Code and Cypher School (GC&CS). She worked at Bletchley Park in the section known as Hut 8 and quickly became the only female practitioner of Banburismus, a cryptanalytic process developed by Alan Turing which reduced the need for bombes—electromechanical devices as used by British cryptologists Welchman and Turing to decipher German encrypted messages during World War II. Clarke's first work promotion was to Linguist Grade which was designed to earn her extra money despite the fact that she did not speak another language. This promotion was a recognition of her workload and contributions to the team.

In 1941, trawlers were captured as well as their cipher equipment and codes. Before this information was obtained, wolf packs had sunk 282,000 tons of shipping a month from March to June 1941. By November, Clarke and her team were able to reduce this number to 62,000 tons. Hugh Alexander, head of Hut 8 from 1943 to 1944, described her as "one of the best Banburists in the section". Alexander himself was regarded as the best of the Banburists. He and I. J. Good considered the process more an intellectual game than a job. It was "not easy enough to be trivial, but not difficult enough to cause a nervous breakdown".

Clarke became deputy head of Hut 8 in 1944, although she was prevented from progressing because of her sex, and was paid less than the men. Clarke and Turing had been close friends since soon after they met, and continued to be until Turing's death in 1954. They shared many hobbies and had similar personalities. They became very good friends at Bletchley Park. Turing arranged their shifts so they could work together, and they also spent much of their free time together. In early 1941, Turing proposed marriage to Clarke, and subsequently introduced her to his family. Although he privately admitted his homosexuality to her—she was reportedly unfazed by the revelation—Turing decided that he could not go through with the marriage, and broke up with Clarke in mid-1941. Clarke later admitted that she suspected Turing's homosexuality for some time, and it was not much of a surprise when he made the admission to her.

After the war
After the war, Clarke worked for Government Communications Headquarters (GCHQ). There, in 1947, she met Lieutenant-Colonel John Kenneth Ronald Murray, a retired army officer who had served in India. They were married by the Bishop of Chichester on 26 July 1952 in Chichester Cathedral, where her father was a Canon. Shortly after their marriage, John Murray retired from GCHQ due to ill health and the couple moved to Crail in Fife where they lived at Priorscroft, 14 Nethergate. They returned to work at GCHQ in 1962 where Clarke remained until 1977 when she retired aged 60.

Following her husband's death in 1986, Clarke moved to Headington, Oxfordshire, where she continued her research into coinage. During the 1980s, she assisted Sir Harry Hinsley with the appendix to volume 3, part 2 of British Intelligence in the Second World War. She also assisted historians studying war-time code breaking at Bletchley Park. Due to continuing secrecy among cryptanalysts, the full extent of her accomplishments remains unknown.

Numismatic interest
After meeting her husband, who had published work on the Scottish coinage of the 16th and 17th centuries, Clarke developed an interest in numismatics history. She established the sequence of the complex series of gold unicorn and heavy groat coins that were in circulation in Scotland during the reigns of James III and James IV. In 1986, her research was recognised by the British Numismatic Society when she was awarded the Sanford Saltus Gold Medal. Issue No. 405 of the Numismatic Circular described her paper on the topic as "magisterial".

Death
On 4 September 1996, Clarke died at her home at 7 Larkfields, Headington Quarry. An Oxfordshire Blue Plaque was unveiled on her house on 27 July 2019.

Portrayal in adaptation
Clarke was portrayed by Keira Knightley in the film The Imitation Game (2014), opposite Benedict Cumberbatch as Alan Turing. Turing's surviving niece, Inagh Payne, described Clarke as "rather plain" and thought that Knightley was inappropriately cast as Clarke. Turing biographer Andrew Hodges also criticised the film, stating the script "built up the relationship with Joan much more than it actually was".

In contrast, an article by BBC journalist Joe Miller stated that Clarke's "story has been immortalised". In terms of the film itself, director Morten Tyldum has argued that it shows how Clarke succeeded in her field despite working in a time "when intelligence wasn't really appreciated in women".

Knightley was nominated for the Academy Award for Best Supporting Actress at the 87th Academy Awards for her performance as Clarke.

References

1917 births
1996 deaths
20th-century British historians
20th-century British mathematicians
Alumni of Newnham College, Cambridge
Bletchley Park women
British numismatists
British women historians
British women mathematicians
Foreign Office personnel of World War II
GCHQ cryptographers
Members of the Order of the British Empire
People from West Norwood
Women numismatists
Bletchley Park people